Hawk the Slayer is a 1980 sword and sorcery adventure film directed by Terry Marcel, and starring John Terry and Jack Palance. The story follows two warring brothers who fight to gain control of a magical sword. Brave warrior, the titular Hawk, assembles a small force of fighters to help them rid the land of a powerful and devious enemy.

Marcel had been working with Harry Robertson when they realized that they both were fans of the S&S genre. Marcel has stated that it was not intended to include magic at all, and was supposed to be a historical film. In the course of writing the script, he then introduced the magical mind stone, changing the overall nature.

The film had an initial negative reception but has since developed a cult following. Sequels were planned, but never produced.

Plot
Voltan infiltrates his father's castle and demands the key to the ancient power but is denied. The wicked Voltan mortally wounds his own father when the latter refuses to turn over the magic of the "last elven mind stone". As the old man lies dying, another son, Hawk enters the castle, and is bequeathed a great sword with a pommel shaped like a human hand which attaches itself to mind stone. The sword is now imbued with magical powers and can respond to Hawk's mental commands. Hawk then vows to avenge his father by killing Voltan.
 
Voltan torments the whole countryside. Some time later a warrior, Ranulf is struggling to run away from Voltan's forces. Ranulf arrives at a remote convent. Ranulf tells the nuns that he survived Voltan's attack on his village and his people, which resulted in the brutal horrifying deaths of women and children. Ranulf is seriously injured and nursed back to health by the nuns losing a hand in the process.

Voltan calls out to his wizard to stave off the pain he has in his wounded face. The wizard performs a spell on his face, telling him “your face will not pain you for a while” and “there is one who stands between us and the final victory, you will prepare the way to his death.”

Voltan appears at the convent interrupting the nuns mass and kidnaps the Abbess, demanding a large sum of gold as a ransom. After Voltan and his henchmen leave with the Abbess, the nuns tell Ranulf to seek the High Abbot at the Fortress of Danesford.

Ranulf arrive at the fortress of Daneford. The High Abbot tells him to find the warrior called Hawk. The High Abbot gives Ranulf a token to give to Hawk when he finds him.

Hawk is travelling through the land and discovers Ranulf has been captured by brigands. Hawk rescues him and Ranulf convinces Hawk to rescue the Abbess.

Hawk locates his old friends: Gort, a giant who wields a war hammer; Crow, an elf who uses a bow; and Baldin, a dwarf skilled with a whip. The five warriors travel to at the convent and fight Voltan's men. It is not enough though and Voltan threatens to kill the Abbess. Voltan still demands the ransom. Hawk steals gold from a slave trader to pay the ransom.

Hawk doubts that Voltan will free the Abbess after the ransom is paid as Voltan had treacherously murdered Hawk's wife, Eliane. Hawk and his team attack Voltan's camp to rescue the Abbess but fail. Hawk kills Voltan's son Drogo. Enraged, Voltan confronts the heroes in a final battle at the convent and with the aid of a turn-cloak nun captures the team. A sorceress, the friend of Hawk helps the heroes escape, but Baldin is mortally wounded as a result.

The heroes now attack the convent for the last time for Hawk to exact his revenge on Voltan; Crow is wounded and Ranulf is killed, Hawk battles his way to Voltan, taking down Voltan's men relentlessly, he confronts Voltan who has managed to get Gort and the Abbess's sisters as prisoners. Hawk asks for them to be set free in exchange for Hawk to be Voltan's prisoner. Voltan agrees but Hawk manages to free Gort, and the two fight Voltan and his remaining men killing them all.

Hawk and Gort travel off to find new adventures leaving Crow to be tended to by the nuns. An evil wizard carries off Voltan's body.

Cast

 John Terry as Hawk
 Jack Palance as Voltan, Hawk's evil brother
 Bernard Bresslaw as Gort, a giant
 Ray Charleson as Crow, an elf
 Peter O'Farrell as Baldin, a dwarf
 W. Morgan Sheppard as Ranulf
 Patricia Quinn as Woman, a Sorceress
 Cheryl Campbell as Sister Monica
 Annette Crosbie as Abbess
 Catriona MacColl as Eliane
 Shane Briant as Drogo
 Harry Andrews as High Abbot
 Christopher Benjamin as Fitzwalter
 Roy Kinnear as Innkeeper
 Patrick Magee as Priest
 Ferdy Mayne as Old Man (Hawk & Voltan's Father)
 Graham Stark as Sparrow
 Warren Clarke as Scar
 Derrick O'Connor as Ralf

Legacy

Sequel
A possible 1981 sequel was referred to in the US magazine Cinefantastique (Fall 1980 Issue) but never made. The director is quoted as saying "...I'll be going on a trip looking for locations for the next one. Whether ITC does it or not, we will be making HAWK - THE DESTROYER in February [1981]'.

In 2015, a sequel titled Hawk the Hunter was reported to be in development with a $5 million budget. There was an unsuccessful attempt to crowdfund on Kickstarter. The intended beginning of filming in late 2015 has been postponed.
In addition to the sequel, British video game company Rebellion Developments plan to release a game, and Marcel has plans for a TV series called Hawk the Destroyer.

In a YouTube interview, Marcel stated that he wanted to explore more of the origin of Hawk and Voltan, how Hawk became a warrior and how Voltan became evil. he also wanted to expand on the idea that there was more than one magical stone besides the mind stone that Hawk wields on his sword. He also wanted to show a little bit about the elves in Hawk's land and imagined the film as a prequel to the original.

Commentary
On 16 October 2014 the film was released as a VOD title by RiffTrax

Comics
Beginning in 2022 a Hawk the Slayer comic is being published in the Judge Dredd Megazine (in supplements to issues 440 to 444) and separately as a limited series, written by Garth Ennis with art by Henry Flint. The story is a sequel to the film.

In other media
A line of dialogue spoken in the film by Voltan was sampled by British rock band The Darkness on their 2013 single Nothing's Gonna Stop Us.

References

External links
 
 
 Twitchfilm.net report on Hawk the Hunter, the sequel

1980 films
1980s fantasy adventure films
British fantasy adventure films
Films directed by Terry Marcel
Films set in the Middle Ages
Films shot in Buckinghamshire
Films shot in England
Films shot in Nottinghamshire
Sword and sorcery films
Films shot at Pinewood Studios
ITC Entertainment films
Patricide in fiction
1980s English-language films
1980s British films